"Infected" is a song by American punk rock band Bad Religion, written by Brett Gurewitz. It was released as a single in 1994 and appears on their eighth studio album Stranger Than Fiction. Along with "21st Century (Digital Boy)", "Infected" is considered to be their breakthrough song, as it received airplay from modern rock radio stations. It is also a live staple for the band.

During the 1990s, frontman Greg Graffin used to sing "don't be mad about it, Bobby", referring to then-drummer Bobby Schayer, instead of "don't be mad about it, baby".

Reception
AllMusic claimed the song along with "Television" are the "two least effective songs of their 15 years." Billboard described the song as "not for the musak crowd, but it is an absolute must for programmers of modern rock radio.

Charts

References

Bad Religion songs
1994 singles
Songs written by Brett Gurewitz
American alternative rock songs
1994 songs
Atlantic Records singles
Songs about diseases and disorders